Let There Be Love is a jazz studio album by the regular trio of John Pizzarelli, composed of him, his brother Martin Pizzarelli on double-bass, and pianist Ray Kennedy.

Track listing
"Let There Be Love"
"I'm Putting All My Eggs in One Basket"
"These Foolish Things"
"All I Saw Was You"
"Everything I Have Is Yours"
"Stompin' at the Savoy"
"Follow"
"Our Little Secret"
"You'll Never Know"
"I Don't Know Why (I Just Do)"
"Our Love Rolls On"
"Just One More Chance"
"Lucky Charm"
"Da Vinci's Eyes"
"What Is There to Say"

Personnel
John Pizzarelliguitar, vocal
Martin Pizzarellidouble-bass
Ray Kennedypiano
Tony Tedescobrushes on phone book
Harry Allentenor saxophone (4, 5, 14)
Jesse Levycello (14)
Ken Peplowskiclarinet (6, 14)
Bucky Pizzarelliguitar (10, 12)

References

2000 albums
John Pizzarelli albums